West Middleton is an unincorporated community in Dane County, Wisconsin, United States, located just west of the city of Madison in the town of Middleton. It is home to West Middleton Elementary School, West Middleton Lutheran Church, West Middleton Laurel Baseball Team, and several large residential sub-divisions.

References

Unincorporated communities in Dane County, Wisconsin
Unincorporated communities in Wisconsin
Middleton, Wisconsin